Shadow Lord is a Star Trek: The Original Series novel written by Laurence Yep.

Plot
Prince Vikram of the planet Angira has spent some time studying on Earth. He plans to return home with new ways of changing his homeland. Accompanying him are Spock and Hikaru Sulu. Resistance comes from Angirans who hate new technology. The two Starfleet officers are swept up in the fighting and must use primitive weapons themselves to survive.

References

External links

Novels based on Star Trek: The Original Series
1985 American novels
American science fiction novels
Novels by Laurence Yep